William Ward (second ¼ 1888 – death unknown) was an English professional rugby league footballer who played in the 1900s, 1910s and 1920s. He played at representative level for Great Britain and England, and at club level for Whitehaven, Egremont and Leeds (for 13-years), as a forward (prior to the specialist positions of), during the era of contested scrums.

Background
Billy Ward's birth was registered in Whitehaven, Cumberland, England.

Playing career

International honours
Billy Ward won caps for England while at Leeds in 1910 against Wales, in 1911 against Australia, and won a cap for Great Britain while at Leeds on the 1910 Great Britain Lions tour of Australia and New Zealand against Australia.

Challenge Cup Final appearances
Billy Ward played as a forward, i.e. number 13, in Leeds' 7-7 draw with Hull F.C. in the 1909–10 Challenge Cup Final during the 1909–10 season at Fartown Ground, Huddersfield on Saturday 16 April 1910, in front of a crowd of 19,413, this was the first Challenge Cup Final to be drawn, and played as a forward, i.e. number 11, in the 26-12 victory over Hull F.C. in the 1909–10 Challenge Cup Final replay during the 1909–10 season at Fartown Ground, Huddersfield on Monday 18 April 1910, in front of a crowd of 11,608, this was Leeds' first Challenge Cup Final win in their first appearance.

County Cup Final appearances
Billy Ward played as a forward, i.e. number 13, in Leeds' 11-3 victory over Dewsbury in the 1921–22 Yorkshire County Cup Final during the 1921–22 season at Thrum Hall, Halifax on Saturday 26 November 1921.

References

External links

1888 births
Egremont Rangers players
England national rugby league team players
English rugby league players
Great Britain national rugby league team players
Leeds Rhinos players
Place of death missing
Rugby league forwards
Rugby league players from Whitehaven
Whitehaven R.L.F.C. players
Year of death missing